Goldenhorse are a pop band from New Zealand.

Release

Goldenhorse's debut album Riverhead was released in October 2002, to a small fanfare. But over the next 18 months various singles from the album started to be played on the radio. The band played live throughout New Zealand continuously and sales of the record climbed slowly then steadily and in August 2004 the album reached no.1 on the national charts.

In 2010, Goldenhorse founding member Ben King debuted his new musical project Grand Rapids. Grand Rapids released their debut album Faintheartedness in April 2011. It was released as an exclusive limited edition vinyl through MusicHype.

In February 2012, the band provided the theme song for TV2's commercial which was a re-recorded version of "I'm Free", originally written by The Rolling Stones in 1965.

Discography

Studio albums

Singles

Charity singles

References

External links
Official Site (broken link)
AudioCulture profile

New Zealand pop rock groups